Gerrhopilus bisubocularis, also known as the Javanese blind snake or Western Java worm snake, is a species of snake in the Gerrhopilidae family.

References

bisubocularis
Reptiles described in 1893